ZOO Park Stropkov is a zoo in the town of Stropkov, Slovakia. It opened in 1984.

, it had more than 200 birds, mammals and reptiles from more than 60 species. The zoo offers many activities and attractions for children.

External links

Official website 

Zoos in Slovakia
Stropkov
Zoos established in 1984
Articles needing infobox zoo
1984 establishments in Czechoslovakia